Mannfield (sometimes incorrectly called Mansfield or Mannsfield) is a ghost town near Lecanto, Florida, in the Withlacoochee State Forest.

History 
Mannfield was settled by early pioneer, Austin Mann, an active citrus farmer and cattle rancher. Mann formed a company to dig and operate canals on the east side of the county. He was also active in politics and as the area's State Senator Mann guided through legislature the bill that created Citrus as a county in 1887.  He selected Mannfield as the first county seat.
The village of Mannfield (geographically located in the center of the newly created county) was selected to be the acting Citrus seat for two years, after which a vote of the county electors was to decide the permanent site. Two factions soon developed, the supporters of Mannfield and those wishing to transfer the county seat to Inverness.  It appears that Mannfield was intended as a temporary county seat only. The county commissioners originally met at a local church, while court functions were conducted in the Moffatt and Gaffney residences, the latter of which rented for the sum of $19 per month.
Various inconclusive elections were held, until on May 4, 1891, Inverness won by a close vote. The controversy continued, and at times erupted into physical violence, since the Mannfield faction refused to accept the election results. Finally, this faction obtained a court injunction to block the transfer of the courthouse to Inverness to affect the transfer before the injunction could be served the Inverness faction moved the county government in the middle of the night in May 1891, transferring all county records, court furniture and fixtures in wagons brought for that purpose. The County Clerk, Captain W. C. Zimmerman, refused to move, and so was lifted up in his chair and placed in a wagon. Upon his arrival in Inverness, Zimmerman was unloaded and told to declare Inverness the new county seat.

Mannfield was settled in 1884. In 1887 Hernando County was divided into three counties, Pasco, Citrus and the present-day Hernando County. Mannfield became the county seat of Citrus. It once had a hotel, church, school, 3 general stores, a sawmill and a newspaper. In 1893 the railroad came through the county and bypassed Mannfield in favor of Inverness. Soon after the old Mannfield courthouse was put on logs and rolled 5 miles through the pines to the settlement of Landrum and used as a private residence.

During the Great Depression, the Federal Government acquired the Mannfield and surrounding area to form the Withlacoochee Development Service from private landowners between 1936 and 1939 under the provisions of the U.S. Land Resettlement Administration. By 1957, it was relinquished to the Florida Department of Agriculture's Division of Forestry and was renamed Withlacoochee State Forest. Mannfield lies on the outskirts of the forest, less than a mile from CR 491. Traces still remain, including foundations, cemetery and oaks which were said to line the main street. A pond nearby also bears the town's name. Mannfield lies within the Lecanto Sandhills, an environmentally sensitive region.

References

External links 

 The History of Citrus County
 Mannfield - Ghost Town
 Citrus County Maps

Former populated places in Citrus County, Florida
Ghost towns in Florida
Former county seats in Florida